Scutigera is a centipede genus in the scutigeromorph (house centipede) family Scutigeridae, a group of centipedes with long limbs and true compound eyes (which were once thought to be secondary, re-evolved "pseudofacetted eyes"). It compose of more than 30 species, including the most common and well-studied Scutigera coleoptrata.

Species

Extant species 
 Scutigera aethiopica
 Scutigera argentina
 Scutigera asiatica
 Scutigera buda
 Scutigera carrizala
 Scutigera chichivaca
 Scutigera coleoptrata
 Scutigera complanata
 Scutigera dubia
 Scutigera fissiloba
 Scutigera flavistoma
 Scutigera hispida
 Scutigera linceci
 Scutigera longitarsis
 Scutigera marmorea
 Scutigera melanostoma
 Scutigera nossibei
 Scutigera oweni
 Scutigera oxypyga
 Scutigera parcespinosa
 Scutigera planiceps
 Scutigera poicila
 Scutigera rubrilineata
 Scutigera sanguinea
 Scutigera sinuata
 Scutigera smithii
 Scutigera tancitarona
 Scutigera tonsoris
 Scutigera virescens
 Scutigera voeltzkowi

Fossil species 

 Scutigera illigeri, Eocene of Poland (Baltic amber)
 Scutigera leachi, Eocene of Poland (Baltic amber)

References 

 Lamarck J.-B., 1801. "Système des animaux sans vertebres". Paris, Deterville VIII + 432 pp., see p. 182.
 Würmli, M., 1977. "Zur Systematik der Gattung Scutigera (Chilopoda: Scutigeridae)". Abhandlungen und Verhandlungen des Naturwissenschaftlichen Vereins in Hamburg N.F. 20: 123-131, see p. 123.

External links 
 
 

Centipede genera
Scutigeromorpha